Emmanuel Church is a historic Episcopal church located at Greenwood in Albemarle County, Virginia.  Emmanuel Episcopal Church is a parish church in the Episcopal Diocese of Virginia.

The mission of Emmanuel Episcopal Church is: ""May we live in Christ and seek to do His Work from this place."

History of Emmanuel Church
In the 1850s church members began meeting in homes and then in a Baptist church in Hillsboro. The first service in the new building was on Christmas Day 1863 with preaching by Reverend Dabney C. T. Davis.  In 1868 the church entered into an agreement with St. Paul's – Ivy to share a rector and resources. In 1899 the church planted St. Georges Chapel where services were held from 1899 to 1941. In 1900 Archdeacon Neve established the Church of the Holy Cross near Batesville as a mission of Emmanuel.

The original church was built in 1863, Thomas Conrad Bowen (Grandfather of James Armistead Shirley Sr. of Greenwood) gave the original building materials for the Church, with additions and modifications made in 1905 and 1911. The 1911 modifications were largely financed by children of Chiswell Langhorne, including Nancy Astor, Viscountess Astor. These modifications were designed by architect Waddy Butler Wood (1869-1944). The church consists of a narthex located in the bell tower, nave with gallery, and chancel flanked by two small rooms. It is a rectangular brick building with a slate roof.  The parish hall was doubled in size and restorations made to the church about 1940 by Charlottesville architect Milton L. Grigg (1905-1982). Arcades connect the church to the parish hall and form a cloistered courtyard. It was added to the National Register of Historic Places in 1982.

Rectors
Rev. Dabney C. T. Davis, 1860-1864
 Rev. Samuel R. Slack, 1864 – 1865
 Rev. William Clement Butler, 1866-1867
 Rev. William Meade Nelson, 1867-1871
 Rev. John Albert Greaves, 1874-1884
 Rev. George Moseley Murray, 1884
 Rev. John Armitage Farrar, 1887
 Rev. Frederick W. Neve, 1888 – 1905
 Rev. Walter Russell Bowie, 1908-1911
 Rev. Clifford D. Powers, 1912-1915
 Rev. Campbell Mayers, 1915-1921
 Rev. Edward H. Vogt, 1923-1925
 Rev. John Scott Meredith, 1926-1957
 Rev. H. Lee Marston, 1937-1969
 Rev. Howard A. LaRue, 1969-1995
 Rev. Charles A. Mullaly, 1997-2012
 Rev. Christopher Garcia, 2013-2017

Gallery

References and Sources
Jubilee – The Emmanuel Family – 1860-1985 – a comprehensive record of Emmanuel’s history from 1860 – 1985 compiled by Rev. Howard LaRue.

See also
 Ramsay (Greenwood, Virginia)
 Mirador (Greenwood, Virginia)

External links

www.emmanuelgreenwood.org

Episcopal churches in Virginia
Colonial Revival architecture in Virginia
Churches completed in 1863
Churches in Albemarle County, Virginia
Churches on the National Register of Historic Places in Virginia
National Register of Historic Places in Albemarle County, Virginia
19th-century Episcopal church buildings